The formation of a Dutch cabinet is the process of negotiating an agreement that will get majority support in parliament for the appointment of the council of ministers and gives sufficient confidence that agreed policies will be supported by parliament. Dutch cabinet formations tend to be a time-consuming process, and the process is for the most part not codified in the constitution.

Formation process 

The cabinet of the Netherlands is the executive body of the Dutch government. It consists of ministers and junior ministers, or state secretaries (staatssecretaris) as they are called in the Netherlands. The cabinet requires support from both chambers of the Dutch parliament to pass laws. Thus to form a stable government sufficient, and preferably majority support in both chambers is required.

Due to several factors—the multi-party system and the nationwide party-list system of proportional representation—no political party (in the modern sense) has ever had a majority in the House of Representatives since 1900.  Indeed, since the adoption of the current proportional representation system in 1918, no party has even come close to the number of seats needed for a majority in its own right. To gain sufficient support in both chambers, at least two parties must agree to form a government with majority support. The negotiations leading to this agreement are the cabinet formation period in the Netherlands.

Cabinet formation is engaged in, in two situations. After each general election, the incumbent cabinet resigns, but continues in a caretaker role until a new cabinet is formed. Due to changing party representations in the House of Representatives, a new cabinet has to be negotiated. Even if the same parties that were part of the previous government continue in office, the agreement has to be renegotiated to fit election promises and shift in powers. Another reason for cabinet formation can be the fall of a cabinet, i.e., those cases where the agreement between parties breaks down. In the latter case (in principle) a new cabinet can be formed without general elections, although in practice the House of Representatives is almost always disbanded and early general elections are called.

Advice 
First, the leaders of all the elected parties meet with the Speaker of the House of Representatives to appoint a 'scout'. Next, the scout meets with the chairs of each parliamentary party in the House of Representatives, the political leaders of all parties. The talks concern how to interpret the election results and on which parties should form the new cabinet.

Information phase 
On basis of this advice, the House of Representatives then appoints an informateur who explores the options for a new cabinet. The informateur often is a relative outsider and a veteran politician who has retired from active politics: a member of the Senate, Council of State or a minister of state. The informateur generally has a background in the largest party in the House of Representatives. It is also possible to appoint multiple informateurs, with backgrounds in other prospective partners. The informateur is given a specific task by the House of Representatives, often to "seek a coalition of parties with coalition agreement and a majority in parliament." The informateur has meetings with individual chairs of parliamentary parties, and chairs sessions of negotiations between them. During these negotiations the parties try to find compromises on the policies of the future government and draft a coalition agreement.

Formation phase 
Unsuccessful informateurs tenders their resignation and the process starts again, with new consultations and the appointment of a new informateur.  If successful, the informateur will advise the House of Representatives to appoint a formateur. By convention, the formateur is the leader of the senior partner in the prospective coalition, and hence the prospective prime minister. The formateur concludes the talks between the members of the prospective coalition, focusing on any matters left unresolved by the informateur.  Once these matters are resolved, the formateur allocates the government portfolios and nominates cabinet members.

It usually takes several months of negotiations before the formateur is ready to accept a formal royal invitation to form a government. The monarch then appoints all ministers and state secretaries individually by Royal Decree (Koninklijk Besluit). Each minister swears an oath of loyalty to the Constitution. After this the entire Council of Ministers and the monarch are photographed on the stairs of Huis ten Bosch palace.  The newly minted ministers all tender their resignations from the House of Representatives, as cabinet ministers are not allowed to be members of Parliament.  The new cabinet then proposes its program to parliament, and is confirmed in office.

Prior to 2012, the monarch played a considerable role in the formation of a government. After each election, he or she met with the presiding officers of both legislative chambers, then with the parliamentary leaders of the parties represented in the House of Representatives, in order to help interpret the election results and determine who should lead the next government. On the basis of this advice, the monarch then appointed an informateur to begin negotiations. If successful, the informateur returned to the monarch, who then appointed a formateur. However, in 2012, the States-General changed the formation procedure so that it takes place without royal influence.

Demissionary cabinet 
After the dissolution of parliament and before the appointment of a new cabinet, the incumbent cabinet stays on as a demissionary cabinet, limiting itself to urgent and pressing matters and traditionally not taking any controversial decisions. If the cabinet fell because one of the parties removed its support, it is possible for the ministers and state secretaries representing that party to leave the cabinet without the cabinet becoming demissionary: the other parties then continue to form a new cabinet, which is called a rump cabinet, often a minority government. It is also possible for the monarch to ask the ministers to remain demissionary in office until a new parliament has been elected.

Importance of the formation 
The formation is often considered as important as the elections themselves – or even more important. This is because the coalition agreement lays down most of the policies for the future cabinet.

Criticism 
The process has been criticized for many reasons. First, it takes place out of public and parliament's view, which means democratic control over the process is limited. Finally, it can take a very long time, often several months. The longest cabinet formation was the 2021-2022 cabinet formation which took 299 days. During this period the previous cabinet serves as caretaker, and has to deal with the new lower house composition. It is custom that caretaker cabinets do not launch any new initiatives; which means that long term policy is on hold during the formation phase. 

There have often been proposals to codify the procedure in the constitution and make it more democratic. One proposal is to let the population elect the Prime Minister separately. This has always been rejected because it might result in a prime minister being elected at the same time as a parliamentary majority of opposing political signature.

References 

Cabinet of the Netherlands
Cabinet formation